Sue or Susan Jones may refer to:

Sue Jones (actress), Welsh-born Australian actress
Sue Jones (Ravi Shankar), had relationship with Ravi Shankar, father of Norah Jones
Sue Jones (priest) (born 1960), Anglican priest
Sue Jones (computational biologist), British computational biologist
Susan Elan Jones (born 1968), British politician
Susan Jones (swimmer) (born 1954), British Olympic swimmer
Susan Henshaw Jones, American museum director

See also
Sue Jones-Davies (born 1949), Welsh actress and singer
Susie Jones (disambiguation)
Susannah Jones (disambiguation)
Jones (disambiguation)